The Popular Assembly is a left-wing political party in Uruguay.

History
The party was founded in April 2006, as a further left alternative to the Broad Front. It is supported by the Revolutionary Communist Party of Uruguay, the Humanist Party of Uruguay and other left-wing groups, including several former local organisation of the Broad Left.  In 2008, it gained the support of the March 26 Movement.

The party's best known members include former Senator Helios Sarthou, and political activist Raúl Rodríguez.  The group stood Rodriguez in the 2009 presidential election.  He took 0.67% of the vote, while the party took 0.66% in the parliamentary elections and did not win any seats.

2014 elections
Popular Assembly took part in the 2014 Uruguayan general elections under the denomination Popular Unity. The party won their first seat in the House of Deputies.

References

External links

2006 establishments in Uruguay
Political parties established in 2006
Political parties in Uruguay